Bilara is a city and a municipality located in the Jodhpur district of Rajasthan, India. It is the administrative headquarters for Bilara tehsil and a market center for the surrounding agricultural area.

Demographics
Bilara is a Municipality city in district of Jodhpur, Rajasthan. The Bilara city is divided into 35 wards for which elections are held every 5 years. In the 2011 India census, Urban population of Bilara was 71,396. Males constituted 51.8% (36,974) of the population and females 48.2% (34,422), for a gender ratio of 931 females per thousand males.[1] Bilara had an average literacy rate of 57%, lower than the national average of 59.5%; with male literacy of 73% and female literacy of 40%. In 2001 in Bilara, 13.6% of the population was under 6 years of age.

Infrastructure
Bilara lies on National Highway 25 between the cities of Jodhpur and Jaitaran, and is the terminus for a rail line from Pipar City. The National Highways Authority of India (NHAI) has issued Letter of Award (LOA) for development of a national highway section in the state of Rajasthan under phase IV of National Highways Development Projects (NHDP). The 111 km long Bar-Bilara-Jodhpur section connects western Rajasthan and border areas (Jodhpur-Jaisalmer-Barmer) to the eastern parts of Rajasthan, Ajmer and Jaipur. This is a major strategic route connecting Jodhpur as an important feeder route during war time. Four-laning of the section will permit smooth flow of military traffic as well as heavy commercial and domestic traffic. It will also facilitate transportation of mining and agriculture product.

References

Cities and towns in Jodhpur district